Kenan Hajdarević (born 29 January 1990) is a Bosnian-Herzegovinian footballer who plays as a striker for Danish lower league side Vatanspor.

Club career
He has played for several Danish league sides, having had two spells with Fredericia.

References

External links
 Profile – Elite Football

1990 births
Living people
Association football forwards
Bosnia and Herzegovina footballers
Danish men's footballers
FC Fredericia players
AC Horsens players
SønderjyskE Fodbold players
Jönköpings Södra IF players
Akademisk Boldklub players
KÍ Klaksvík players
Brabrand IF players
Danish Superliga players
Danish 1st Division players
Superettan players
Tercera División players
Denmark Series players
Bosnia and Herzegovina expatriate footballers
Expatriate footballers in Sweden
Bosnia and Herzegovina expatriate sportspeople in Sweden
Expatriate footballers in the Faroe Islands
Bosnia and Herzegovina expatriate sportspeople in the Faroe Islands
Expatriate footballers in Spain
Bosnia and Herzegovina expatriate sportspeople in Spain